Nemophila breviflora is a species of flowering plant in the borage family known by the common names basin nemophila, Great Basin nemophila, and Great Basin baby-blue-eyes. It is native to southwestern Canada and the northwestern United States, where it generally grows in wooded and forested areas in thickets and moist streambanks.

It is an annual herb with a fleshy, somewhat prickly stem growing 10 to 30 centimeters tall. The alternately arranged leaves are divided into several wide, pointed lobes. Flowers are solitary, each on a short pedicel. The flower has a calyx of sepals each a few millimeters long, pointed, and edged with stiff hairs, and there are reflexed appendages between the sepals. The bell-shaped flower corolla is white or purple-tinged and a few millimeters wide. The fruit is a capsule which develops within the calyx of sepals and contains a single red, pitted seed.

External links
Jepson Manual Treatment
Washington Burke Museum Profile

breviflora
Flora of Western Canada
Flora of the Northwestern United States
Flora of California
Flora of the Great Basin
Flora without expected TNC conservation status